Shannon Walsh is a Canadian filmmaker, writer and scholar. She has directed the feature
documentaries The Gig Is Up, H2Oil ,À St-Henri, le 26 août, Jeppe on a Friday  and Illusions of Control. She has also directed music videos for the Montreal based artist Little Scream.

Walsh, who was born in London, Ontario, is also an academic, and teaches film production at the University of British Columbia in the Department of Theatre and Film. She is the co-editor of the book Ties that Bind: Race and the Politics of Friendship in South Africa with historian Jon Soske. She was awarded a Guggenheim Fellowship in 2020.

Filmography

Feature films
2009: H2Oil (feature documentary)
2011: A St-Henri le 26 Aout (feature documentary) 
2013: Jeppe on a Friday (feature documentary) made with Arya Lalloo
2019: Illusions of Control (feature documentary) 
2021: The Gig Is Up (feature documentary)

Short films
2002: Revisit (experimental fiction) directed with Rawi Hage
2003: Sayeh (medium-length documentary) directed with Kaveh Nabatian and Nicolas Rutigliano
2003: Fire & Hope (documentary) 
2004: Close-Up (experimental) 
2006: Inkani (documentary) with Heinrich Bohmke
2007: The Space In Between (short fiction) starring Rich Terfry and Elizabeth Powell
2012: Niger Delta Remix: Last Rights Niger Delta (video installation for the Johannesburg Workshop on Theory and Criticism)
2014: Under the Umbrella (documentary) 
2018: Disappearance: Hong Kong Stories (360 VR documentary)
2019: Matsutake Hunters (documentary) 
2022: This Phantom Pain, Letter #1 (experimental short) 
2022: In Relation, Letter #2 (experimental short)

Screenplays
2014: Man Bitch adaptation of novella by Johan van Wyk
2018: Unidentified Minor''

Awards

Film awards

Academic awards
2003 -	Power Corp Fellowship, Concordia University
2003 -	Fonds Québécois de la recherche sur la société et la culture (FQRSC) MA fellowship
2003 -	CIDA Awards for Canadians
2005 -	Social Sciences and Humanities Research Council, Canadian Graduate Research Scholarship (PhD)
2007 -	Young Researcher Award, SANPAD Poverty Conference, Durban, South Africa
2009 -	Trudeau Foundation Scholarship, Finalist
2011 -	Social Sciences and Humanities Research Council, Post-Doctoral Fellowship
2017 -	Leading Scholar, Green College, University of British Columbia
2018 -	Wall Scholar, Peter Wall Institute for Advanced Studies
2020 -	Guggenheim Fellowship

References

External links

Films by Shannon Walsh at NFB website

Canadian documentary film directors
Film directors from London, Ontario
Living people
1976 births
Canadian women film directors
Canadian women documentary filmmakers